Elk Creek Township is an inactive township in Wright County, in the U.S. state of Missouri.

Elk Creek Township was erected in 1841, taking its name from Elk Creek.

References

Townships in Missouri
Townships in Wright County, Missouri